Wykagyl Country Club is a golf course in the Wykagyl section of New Rochelle, New York. Through the years, the club has hosted major professional and amateur tournaments  and is considered to be one of the premier "classic courses" in the country.

The club is private and application for membership is by invitation only.

History

Creation of the PGA
In February 1916 the Professional Golfers' Association was established in New York City. One month earlier, the wealthy department store owner Rodman Wanamaker hosted a luncheon at the Wykagyl Country Club in New Rochelle.  This gathering of Wanamaker and the leading golf professionals of the day prepared the agenda for the formal organization of the PGA in New York City a month later. The organization's first president was Robert White, one of Wykagyl's best known golf professionals of the time. Golf historians have dubbed Wykagyl "The Cradle of the PGA".

Club grounds
The course was initially designed by Lawrence Van Etten and was completed in 1905. It quickly became famous for both its beauty and the cruelty of its hilly terrain. English golf pro Harry Vardon dubbed the 18th hole, also known as "cardiac hill," as "one of the greatest" he ever played. Over the years Wykagyl has attracted a number of prominent golf pros including George Duncan, Walter Hagen, Ben Hogan, Bobby Jones, Byron Nelson, Sam Snead, and Alex Smith.

The design of the golf course has evolved over the years, although the greens on the 1st, 7th, 9th, and 16th holes remain essentially unchanged from the original design. In the 1920s, several holes including the 5th and 6th were redesigned by Donald Ross, one of the most noted architects of the period. A. W. Tillinghast made additional changes in the 1930s, eliminating holes and improving others. Most recently, Bill Coore and Ben Crenshaw completed structural renovations aimed at preserving the rugged character of the course.

In 2016, the course received a largely positive review by Golf Atlas publisher and leading golf course architecture expert, Ran Morrissett.  In that review review, Bill Coore said of Wykagyl, "It's easy to make a course hard; it is a far greater challenge to make it interesting and that's what they have done at Wykagyl."

Significant  events
Horace Rawlins, winner of the first U.S. Open Championship, held in 1895, later became head professional at Wykagyl. In 1944 Wykagyl hosted its first notable charity event to benefit the American Red Cross, the 1944 New York Red Cross Tournament. The tournament ranked as one of the top events of 1944, as no U.S. Opens were held from 1942 through 1945 because of World War II and no Metropolitan Opens from 1941 through 1948.  The 1949 Goodall Palm Beach Round Robin at Wykagyl was the first golf tournament to be broadcast by a television network. In 1977 the club hosted its first professional event, the LPGA Talk Tournament. Beginning in 1990, the JAL Big Apple Classic became a regular annual event at the club. Although the sponsors and names of the tournament changed over time, the venue remained constant for the next 17 years. In 2007 Wykagyl was the site of the HSBC Women's World Match Play Championship.

Course detail

Lawrence Van Etten, a Wykagyl member, laid out the original golf course when the club moved to New Rochelle in 1905. Over the years nine other golf architects have worked on the course, some very briefly, others more extensively: Walter Travis (1908), Donald Ross (1919), Tom Winton (1920), Roben White (1921–27), A. W. Tillinghast (1930), Trent Jones (1960), Hal Purdy (1963–70), Stephen Kay  (1990), and Arthur Hills (1994). The most significant changes to the course occurred during the redesigns by Ross and Tillinghast.

The Wykagyl course is hilly, tree-lined and very beautiful accented by its stone tees. It is old fashioned, primarily because the three architects who were mainly responsible for the layout of the course - Lawrence Van Enen, Donald Ross and A. W. Tillinghast - all practiced their art over 60 years ago. Because of this it has small greens and more blind shots than any architect could get away with designing today.

The tee shots on Holes 1, 3, 8, 15 and 17 are blind, and there are several blind approach shots on Holes 2, 6 and 14. The second and third shots at Hole 9 are blind, depending on length. There also are several holes that are semi-blind; the surface of the green cannot be seen when playing approach shots on Holes 5, 10, 18, and on 15 (for the long hitter). These blind shots are only blind once. Still, they do make Wykagyl difficult to play for a golfer who has never seen it before. Wykagyl is unique in its mix of par threes, par fours and par fives. Most 18-hole courses have four par threes, four par fives and ten par fours, but Wykagyl has five par fives, five par threes and eight par fours.

Major tournaments  at Wykagyl

The years 1908 through 1916 were very active for golf at Wykagyl. The Club hosted not only its own Invitational event but also the 1909 Metropolitan Open, won by Alex Smith. Smith also captained an American team that competed in the British Open and then played a match against France.

Several world-famous foreign professionals played at Wykagyl in exhibition matches, including George Duncan and Harry Vardon. In other matches, home grown players were the attractions - Jerry Travers and Chick Evans among the amateurs and Walter Hagen and Gil Nicholls from the professional ranks. Often, Wykagyl's Val Bermingham and Alex Smith were in the thick of battle in these contests.

Wykagyl was in the forefront of establishing the Westchester County Golf Association and hosted the first two Westchester County Amateur Championships.

References

Works cited

External links
 Official website
 Golf Atlas Review

Wykagyl, New York
Sports in New Rochelle, New York
Golf clubs and courses in New York (state)
Golf clubs and courses designed by A. W. Tillinghast
1898 establishments in New York (state)
Sports venues in Westchester County, New York